Samoa competed at the 2015 Pacific Games in Port Moresby, Papua New Guinea from 4 to 18 July 2015. Samoa listed 405 competitors as of 4 July 2015. Eight competitors were qualified in two sports.

Athletics

Samoa qualified 5 athletes in track and field:

Women
 Kasandra Salamasina Le Tafaifa Vegas

Men
 Tutaia Galoiola
 Alexander Rose
 Siologa Viliamu Sepa
 Shaka Sola

Parasport
Women
 Maggie Kolopa Aiono

Men
 Alefosio Laki
 Milo Toleafoa

Basketball

Samoa qualified a men's team in basketball (12 players):

Men
 Euta Ezra Collins
 Ezra Pama Tufuga
 Joshua Lafoai
 Ratu Epeli Tabualili Levy
 Theodore Lorenzo Jr. McFarland
 Ryan Paia
 Meki Purcell
 Ene Togia
 Mahonri Tufuga
 Sapeti Mumaleaute Tufuga
 Marquise Cannan Vaili
 Iopu Muliaga

Beach volleyball

Samoa qualified men's and women's teams in beach volleyball:

Women
 Kristal Vaiauau Faamatuainu
 Grace Lina Leo

Men
 Damaris Amerika
 Ioane Lesoa
 Toetu Toetu
 Eneliko Tui
 Lomitusi Ulu

Boxing

Samoan athletes qualified in boxing include:

Men
 Faamanu Aukuso
 Livai Faasala
 Samuelu Faialaga
 Aukusitino Faofua
 Filimaua Hala
 Ropati Hall
 Kaisa Ioane
 Afaese Hugo Fata Kalepi
 Vaimoli Kuresa
 Andrew Leuii
 Paddy Junior Leuii
 Petelo Matagi
 Nelson Meleisea
 Fifita Mosese Pousoo

Cricket

Samoa qualified a women's cricket team (13 players):

 Women
 Meretiana Via Andrew
 Lelia Anne Bourne
 Taalili Iosefo
 Taofi Lafai
 Regina Sela Monika Lilii
 Perelini Mulitalo
 Sinei Mulivai
 Marita Paulo
 Feala Pula
 Lagi Otila Telea
 Moelagi Jessie Tuilagi
 Nathalie Victoria Tuilagi
 Matile Uliao

Football

Samoa qualified a women's football team (19 players):

Women
 Lagi Akari
 Josephine Sina Ane
 Yvonne Frances-Maria Ane
 Monique Fischer
 Jullyn Gasio
 Hilda Hellesoe
 Salaevalu Ikenasio
 Lusia Ioane
 Kelsey Tausala Kapisi
 Lelava Seutatia Laupepa
 Rosei Leota
 Soti Letoa
 Hazel Peleti
 Faanunu Ropeti
 Olga Sagatu
 Shontelle Stevens
 Chelsea Strickland
 Faagi Talosia Lima
 Hana Malo Vaga

Golf

Women
 Olive Auvaa

Men
 Robert Aipopo Faaaliga
 Otane Faatupu
 Uitualagi Laauli
 Malase Maifea
 Ropati Matulino
 Leleaga M M James Meredith
 Timoteo Samau
 Niko Vui
 Van Wright

Netball

Samoa qualified a netball team (initial squad of 18 players):

Women
 Tietie Aiolupotea
 Natalie Taamorangi Kehuroa Jones
 Opheira Henrietta Karatau
 Temukisa Leuluai
 Gloria Joyvita Namulauulu
 Jennifer Naoupu
 Julianna Naoupu
 Grete Lynn Nuralli
 Sanonu Katalina Robertson
 Nicolette Velma Zandee Ropati
 Seiafi Saiaulama Sapolu
 Alana May Schuster
 Auteletoa Tanimo
 Elizabeth Lage Ene Taulelei
 Hanalei Natalia Eseta Temese
 Sanita Anastasia Too
 Betty Vaivasa Vitolina Tito Tuipulotu
 Brooke Amber Williams

Outrigger canoeing

Powerlifting

Samoa qualified 9 athletes in powerlifting:

Women
 Fila Fuamatu (84 kg) – 
 Vanessa Lui (72 kg) – 4th
 Matile Sitagata (+84 kg) –  She set a new open and junior world record in the deadlift with 237.5 kg as well as junior total world record with 550.5 kg.

Men
 Oliva Siusega Kirisome (+120 kg) – 
 Tavita Lipine (120 kg)
 Emau Manusamoa (+120 kg) – 4th
 Ofisa Junior Ofisa (93 kg) – 
 Mikaele Pasuo (83 kg) – 4th
 Koale Junior Taala (105 kg) –

Rugby league nines

Samoa qualified a rugby league nines team (initial squad of 41 players):
Men
 Nissan Aitui
 Alesana Richard Anae
 Fred Fatuomanu Apulu
 Talitonu Faapuea
 Tautua Faauila
 Emile Fanene
 David Fetalaiga
 Ramon Steve Max Filipine
 Jonathan Finauga Fruean
 Joseph Fuimaono
 Faleniu Iosi
 Faalele Iosua
 Gordon Teofilo Lemisio
 John Faausuusu Kasiano Lemisio
 Faafouina Loau
 Arden Teti Meihana McCarthy
 Fosi Nuusavili Melville McCarthy
 Tony Muagututia
 Tanielu Pasene
 Herman Olaf Retzlaff
 Leia Saofaiga
 Malo Solomona
 Saula Solomona
 Henry Suauu
 Silao Talimalo
 Silao Talimao
 Mikaele Tapili
 Ionatana Tino
 Logofaalii Toa
 Pousea Arasile Michael Tofilau
 Onopene Tuaia
 Mikaele Uati Uati
 Uati Mikaele Uati
 Sun Ulula
 Ponifasio Vasa
 Laneselota Taitaifono Veve
 Albert Satupaitea Viali
 Aotealofa Jaeden Tuimavave Wines
 Arnold Joseph Meredith
 Arthur Rudolf Meredith
 Faletuluia-Ale-Taofia Iosefa

Rugby sevens

 Women
5th – Women's tournament.
 Apaula Enesi
 Vanessa Afamasaga
 Mellisha Leaana
 Maria Jacinta Ausai
 Virginia Iona Sofara
 Suititi Ailaoa
 Soteria Pulumu
 Seifono Misili
 Tina Jones
 Pepe Mataipule
 Tafale Roma Malesi

 Men
 – Men's tournament.

Sailing

Samoa qualified one athlete in sailing:

Women
 Bianca Leilua

Shooting

Samoa qualified 11 athletes in shooting:

Men
 David Anthony Asi
 Nicholas Caffelli
 Francis Cafferelli
 Ioane Sakaria Galuvao
 Toddystanley Iosefa
 Siegfried Levi
 Paul Roy Cheetah Loibl
 Robert Wayne Maskell
 Salale Moananu
 Eddie Pengcheng Chan Pao
 Raymond Pesamino Pereira

Swimming

Samoa qualified one athlete in swimming:

Men
 Brandon Schuster

Tennis

Samoa qualified 7 athletes in tennis:

Women
 Steffi Carruthers

Men
 Harley Cronin
 Usufono Fepuleai
 Tautuimoana Victory Leavai
 Sauleone Anasis Saipele
 Leon Soonalole
 Marvin Soonalole

Touch rugby

Samoa qualified men's and women's teams in touch rugby (28 athletes):

Women
 – Women's tournament.
 Miriama Lote Lima
 Alofa Latafale Auvaa
 Filoi Fatima Eneliko
 Lerissa Violina Fong
 Felicity Pogi
 Mandria Angelic Natalie Sua
 Rowena Faaiuaso
 Celeste Faletaulupe Solofa
 Anna Maria Schuster
 Gabrielle Fuatino Apelu
 Eden Yandall
 Vai Leota
 Lepailetai Maria Faaiuaso
 Sabrina Hemara Reupena

Men
 – Men's tournament.
 Sapati Gautasi
 Alex Vaauliafa Iii Mikaele
 Michael James Bernard Rasmussen
 Peter Manuleavi Hazelman
 Darren Aofia
 Rapi Laauli Vaai
 Eteuati Togiatomai
 Jesse Leituvae
 Andrew Elisara
 Gregory Ualivi Hazelman
 Samoauatasi Tolovaa Siilata
 Laumata Msala Laumata
 David (DJ) Fong
 Tasi Cortdz

Volleyball

Samoa qualified men's and women's volleyball teams:

Women
 Kristal Vaiauau Faamatuainu
 Mavaega Falefata
 Margie Fitu
 Mowenna Christina Huch
 Gillian Kiripati
 Tolotea Lealoaina Lealamanua
 Grace Lina Leo
 Taulaga Sulu Malaitai
 Theresa Taililino Malaitai
 Lilly Mauafu
 Elena Mika
 Adrianna Katrina Seufatu
 Faatali Talimalosoo
 Tamara Taviuni
 Emalini Toleafoa
 Leute Mataipule Tuugamusu

Men
 Lauina Aisaka
 Etuale Eteuati
 Jim Kiteau
 Ioane Lesoa
 Vea Junior Sepulona
 Ioane Talalelei Gago
 Talalelei Talalelei
 Francis Uso

Weightlifting

Samoa qualified 8 athletes in weightlifting:

Women
 Vanessa Lui (69 kg)
 Ele Opeloge (75+kg)
 Mary Opeloge (75 kg)

Men 
 Vaipava Nevo Ioane  (62 kg)
 Siaosi Leuo (94 kg)
 Lauititi Lui (105+kg) 
 Petunu Opeloge (85 kg)
 Patrick Pasia (69 kg)

Notes

References

2015 in Samoan sport
Nations at the 2015 Pacific Games
Samoa at the Pacific Games